The Guatemala records in swimming are the fastest ever performances of swimmers from Guatemala, which are recognised and ratified by the Federacion Nacional de Natacion, Clavado, Polo Acuatico y Nado Sincronizado (FENADEGUA).

All records were set in finals unless noted otherwise.

Long Course (50 m)

Men

Women

Mixed relay

Short Course (25 m)

Men

Women

References 
General
Guatemalan Long Course records 5 September 2022 updated
Guatemalan Short Course records 5 September 2022 updated
Specific

External links
FENADEGUA web site

Guatemala
Records
Swimming
Swimming